The Abraham Jones House is a historic home located at Libertytown, Frederick County, Maryland, United States. It is a -story, Flemish bond brick house attached to a later frame structure.  Roof features include low "parapets" formed by the extension of the gable walls and at each end of the roof ridge are single flush gable chimneys. The main entrance door is an example of Federal period craftsmanship and design. It is one of the finest Federal houses in Maryland.

The Abraham Jones House was listed on the National Register of Historic Places in 1973.

References

External links

, including photo from 1974, at Maryland Historical Trust

Houses in Frederick County, Maryland
Houses on the National Register of Historic Places in Maryland
Federal architecture in Maryland
Historic American Buildings Survey in Maryland
National Register of Historic Places in Frederick County, Maryland